Fajing may refer to:

Canon of Laws, a 5th-century BC administrative law code by Li Kui
Fa jin, a term used in some Chinese martial arts related to the use of internal power